Jabri Shareef Abdur-Rahim (born March 22, 2002) is an American college basketball player for the Georgia Bulldogs of the Southeastern Conference (SEC). He previously played for the Virginia Cavaliers.

High school career
In his freshman season at Seton Hall Preparatory School in West Orange, New Jersey, Abdur-Rahim averaged 11.4 points and 4.2 rebounds per game and was named NJ.com Rookie of the Year. As a sophomore, he averaged 17.7 points and 9.2 rebounds and 2.6 assists per game, leading his team to a 24–3 record and earning All-State Third Team honors. For his junior season, he transferred to Blair Academy in Blairstown, New Jersey. Abdur-Rahim averaged 16.6 points, 7.1 rebounds and 2.4 assists per game as a junior, helping his team achieve a 28–3 record and win the Mid-Atlantic Prep League and the New Jersey Prep A state championship. He was named New Jersey Gatorade Player of the Year and to the All-State First Team. After the season, he had success with the New Jersey Playaz Club at the Nike Elite Youth Basketball League. Abdur-Rahim missed most of his senior season with a foot injury and averaged 31.5 points, five rebounds and four assists in his only two games. He was featured in an episode of Slam Magazine's 'Day in the Life' YouTube series in late December of 2019. Also, he was selected to play in the Jordan Brand Classic, which was canceled due to the COVID-19 pandemic.

Recruiting
Abdur-Rahim was considered a four-star recruit, according to major recruiting services. On July 10, 2019, he committed to play college basketball for Virginia over an offers from Michigan, Michigan State, Kansas, Arizona, Auburn, Texas, NC State, USC to name a few. He explained, "I chose them because I felt most comfortable with the staff and I felt they would best prepare me to win on the college level and achieve my ultimate goal of playing in the NBA." Abdur-Rahim signed his letter of intent on December 10, 2019, exactly five months after his commitment to Virginia.

College career

Virginia
On August 1, 2020, Abdur-Rahim enrolled at UVA. He saw action in 8 games, the first being against Towson in the season opener in Bubbleville. Abdur-Rahim was on the floor for 4 minutes while shooting 1-of-2 from the field and finished with 3 points. Six days later, Abdur-Rahim played in his second game as a Cavalier against St. Francis. He was on the floor for 11 minutes but went 0-of-3 from the field with one assist and one rebound. Abdur-Rahim didn't see as much time as he would like to due to the deep bench of the team, and the fact that he was still recovering from his season-ending foot injury from his senior year at Blair Academy. On March 29, 2021, Abdur-Rahim entered the transfer portal, officially ending his tenure as a Cavalier.

Georgia
On April 12, 2021, Abdur-Rahim announced that he would transfer to Georgia. On May 27, 2021 Georgia and Abdur-Rahim made the transfer official.

Career statistics

College

|-
| style="text-align:left;"| 2020–21
| style="text-align:left;"| Virginia
| 8 || 0 || 4.6 || .200 || .143 || 1.000 || .3 || .3 || .1 || .1 || .9

Personal life
Abdur-Rahim's father, Shareef, played in the NBA for 12 years and now serves as president of the NBA G League. His uncle, Amir, played college basketball for Southeastern Louisiana before becoming a college coach, and is the current head coach of Kennesaw State. Abdur-Rahim has three other uncles who played basketball at the college level.

Abdur-Rahim is often referred to as "#40BallBri", a nickname given to him after he dropped back-to-back 40-point games in a 2019 Nike EYBL summer tournament, the first game being against Cade Cunningham and Greg Brown when Abdur-Rahim played against the Texas Titans Nike EYBL team.

References

External links
Georgia Bulldogs bio
Virginia Cavaliers bio
USA Basketball bio

2002 births
Living people
American men's basketball players
Basketball players from California
Blair Academy alumni
Georgia Bulldogs basketball players
People from Mountain View, California
Seton Hall Preparatory School alumni
Shooting guards
Small forwards
Virginia Cavaliers men's basketball players